"Pray / Get into a Groove" is a song by the J-pop group Every Little Thing, released as their fourteenth single on January 1, 2000. The single was released with Avex Music Creative, Inc.

Track listing
 Pray (Words & music - Mitsuru Igarashi) 
 Get into a Groove (Words & music - Mitsuru Igarashi) 
 Pray (Ramdoubler's remix)
 Get into a Groove (HAL's remix)
 Pray (instrumental)
 Get into a Groove (instrumental)

Chart positions

External links
 "Pray / Get into a Groove" information at Avex Network.
 "Pray / Get into a Groove" information at Oricon.

2000 singles
Every Little Thing (band) songs
Songs written by Mitsuru Igarashi
Avex Trax singles